Ghaziabad district is a largely suburban district of Uttar Pradesh state in northern India. It is also a core part of the National Capital Region.  The city of Ghaziabad is the administrative headquarters of the district. This district is part of Meerut Division. It has become a major bedroom community for Delhi.

History
Before 1976, the area of Ghaziabad district was categorized as Ghaziabad Tehsil of Meerut district. On 14 November 1976, then Chief Minister of Uttar Pradesh N.D. Tiwari declared it as a separate district with an area of 2550 sq km.

The district was further reduced in size to 1933 sq km on 6 September 1997 when the Government of Uttar Pradesh carved out the blocks of Dadri and Bisrakh to create Gautam Buddh Nagar district.

In September 2011, the Hapur tehsil was split off (from Ghaziabad district) to form Hapur District by then Chief Minister Mayawati, finally reducing the size of Ghaziabad district to 1273 sq km and the revised population is 33,23,241.

COVID-19 pandemic in Ghaziabad

The first positive case of COVID-19 was confirmed on 5 March 2020 as a businessman resident of Raj Nagar Extension area of Ghaziabad city who returned from Iran.

By June 30, Ghaziabad had highest number of active Covid-19 cases in the state. As of August 21, it had a total of 7,049 confirmed Covid-19 cases, which included 5,846 patients (82.93%) discharged and 67 dead, apart from 1,136 active cases. It had 338 active containment zones in different parts.

Geography
The district is bounded on the northwest by Baghpat District, on the north by Meerut District, on the east by Hapur District, on the southeast by Bulandshahr District, on the southwest by Gautam Buddha Nagar District, and on the west by Delhi state across the Yamuna River. The Hindon River flows through the district.

Demographics
According to the 2011 Census, it is the third most populous district of Uttar Pradesh (out of 75), after Prayagraj and Moradabad.

According to the 2011 census of Ghaziabad district, it has a population of 4,681,645, roughly equal to the nation of Ireland or the US state of South Carolina. This gives it a ranking of 28th highest in India (out of a total of 640). Its population growth rate over the decade 2001–2011 was 41.66%. Ghaziabad has a sex ratio of 878 females for every 1000 males, and a literacy rate of 85%.

At the 2011 census, this district had a population of 4,661,452 (3rd highest in UP), with 2,481,803 males and 2,179,649 females. This is revised to 3,323,241 after Hapur district was split off. Ghaziabad district comprises 2.33% of the total population of UP. It has the highest density of population in the state with 4060 persons per square km. It is also second in population growth rate with a 40.66% rise. The average literacy rate in 2011 was 85%, which was the highest in UP.

Religion
Income disparity exists between Hindus and Muslims.
There were numerous riots with religious context.
The Muslim proportion of Ghaziabad City is much lower than in the district in general. Per the 2011 census, Hindus are the majority, at around 73%, Muslims are the second largest religious community at 25.4% and 0.8% are Buddhist and the remaining 0.8% belong to other religions.

Language
At the time of the 2011 Census of India, 90.96% of the population in the district spoke Hindi, 7.56% Urdu and 0.49% Punjabi as their first language.

References

External links

Ghaziabad district website
Ghaziabad community website
Business Website

Districts of Uttar Pradesh
Meerut division
 
Minority Concentrated Districts in India